Doli Armaanon Ki, ( Palanquin of dreams) (International title: Lies of the Heart), was an Indian television drama series It premiered on 2 December 2013, and ran until 25 September 2015. that aired on ZEE TV Monday through Friday. It stars Mohit Malik and Neha Marda in the lead roles.

Plot 
Urmi Singh, a girl in Jhansi, dreams of marrying 'the perfect' man who might be her 'prince charming'. Her marriage is arranged with a wealthy businessman, Samrat Singh Rathore, who is selfish, arrogant, and short-tempered, unbeknownst to Urmi, as she was told by Samrat's best friend, Ishaan Sinha, that he is a gentleman. During the wedding preparations, Urmi's cousin, Trisha, sees many red flags in Samrat, but Urmi ignores her and marries Samrat.

On their wedding night, Samrat shows his true colours and Urmi is devastated. He begins abusing Urmi, as no one in Samrat's family is willing to stand up to him for her because even they fear his temper. His father, Rudra Singh Rathore and his brother, Dewaker, try to help Urmi, but he ignores them and loses his temper. Ishaan discovers he is deceiving Urmi by abusing and cheating on her, so he breaks ties with Urmi and flees abroad. Urmi leaves Samrat's house on the day of Holi and returns to her parents' house, but soon returns after finding out that she is pregnant with Samrat's child.

5 years later

Urmi and Samrat have a son, Shaurya. On Shaurya's birthday, Urmi has an argument with an old man and is surprised to know that he is Samrat's uncle. He helps Urmi to stand up for herself but it angers Samrat. Urmi files a case against Samrat and finds him cheating on her and leaves with Shaurya. Ishaan returns to India and helps Urmi to get a divorce. Samrat is sentenced to six years in prison.

6 years later

Urmi owns a restaurant with Ishaan's help. Ishaan proposes to Urmi. Samrat returns to take revenge on Urmi and Ishaan. He marries Ishaan's sister, Taani to get closer to them. Urmi is revealed to be pregnant. Samrat tries to kill her but Ishaan dies while saving Samrat. Overcome by guilt, Samrat kills himself. Ishaan's mother, Damini blames Urmi for Ishaan's death.

20 years later

Urmi's children, Shaurya and Ishaani are grown up. Manipulated by Damini, Ishaani hates Urmi believing she killed Ishaan. Shaurya falls in love with Diya and they marry. Ishaani realizes Damini's reality and reconciles with Urmi. Damini is imprisoned. She returns and tries to kill the entire family, but Urmi shoots Damini and the family is reunited.

Cast

Main 
Neha Marda / Manasi Salvi as Urmi Samrat Singh Rathore/Sinha – Devi's elder daughter; Anushka's sister; Samrat's ex-wife; Ishaan's widow; Shaurya and Ishaani's mother (2013–15)
Mohit Malik as Samrat Singh Rathore – Shashikala's son; Dirwakar and Aditi's brother; Ishaan's ex-best friend; Urmi's ex-husband; Taani's husband; Shaurya's father (2013–15) (Dead)
Siddharth Arora / Vibhav Roy as Ishaan Sinha – Anirudh and Damini's son; Taani's brother; Rohit's half-brother; Samrat's ex-best friend; Urmi's second husband; Ishaani's father; Shaurya's adoptive father (2013–15) (Dead)
Ahmad Harhash as Veer Pratap Ishaani's brother Shaurya's adoptive brother (2013–15) (Dead)

Recurring Cast
Kunal Karan Kapoor as Shaurya Singh Rathore/Shaurya Sinha – Urmi and Samrat's son; Ishaan's adoptive son; Ishaani's half-brother; Diya's husband (2015)
 Yash Pandey as Teenge Shaurya Sinha (2015)
 Mitansh Gera as Child Shaurya (2014)
Neha Sargam as Diya Sinha/Diya Tiwari – Shaurya's wife; Urmi and Ishaan's daughter-in-law (2015)
Parvati Sehgal as Taani Samrat Singh Rathore/Sinha – Anirudh and Damini's daughter; Ishaan's sister; Samrat's second wife (2015)
Geeta Tyagi as Shashikala Singh Rathore – Samrat and Aditi's mother; Shaurya's biological grandmother
Hemant Thatte as Gaurav Devi Singh
Anjali Mukhi as Saroj Devi Singh
Sameeksha Sud as Asha Gaurav Singh
Jayant Rawal as Devi Shankar Singh
Gaurav Rana as Diwakar Singh Rathore
Vibhuti Thakur as Kanchan Diwarkar Singh Rathore
Saachi Priya as Mandira Diwakar Singh Rathore: Diwakar and Kanchan's daughter
Jetendra Trehan as Rudra Pratap Singh Rathore
Ragini Gakhar as Aditi Singh Rathore Chauhan – Shashikala's daughter; Samrat's sister; Amrit's wife
Aadesh Chaudhary / Harsh Vashisht as Amrit Singh Chauhan – Aditi's husband
Anupam Shyam as Garjan Singh Rathore – Samrat and Aditi's uncle
Amita Udgata as Gayatri Singh – Devi's mother; Urmi and Anushka's grandmother
Guddi Maruti as Snidhu Bua (Urmi's Bua)
Snigdha Srivastava as Trisha Singh – Urmi and Anushka's cousin, Samrat's enemy
Massheuddin Qureshi as Trisha's father
Manisha Thakkar as Rashmi Singh Rathore / Rashmi Gaurav Singh (Samrat's cousin)
Mehendi Jain as Anushka "Anu" Devi Singh – Devi's younger daughter; Urmi's sister
Shaji Chaudhary as Inspector Anshuman Singh
Varun Sharma as Karan (Anushka's ex-fiancé and friend)
Priya Shinde as Urmi 's NRI friend Natasha
Vertika Verma as Payal (Urmi's friend)
Deepali Saini as Meena (Urmi's hostel friend)
Ayush Mehra as Ravi Darshan Tiwari
Himani Shivpuri as Sushma Tiwari
Raju Kher as Darshan Tiwari
Vishal Puri as Niranjan Khanna
Nidhi Jha as Nidhi Khanna
Shruti Kanwar as Radha, Kanchan's cousin sister
Avinash Wadhawan as Anirudh Sinha – Damini's husband;, Ishaan and Taani's father
Kamya Panjabi as Damini Sinha – Anirudh's wife; Ishaan and Taani's mother
Swati Nanda as Sanaya Seth (Urmi's Mumbai friend, Samrat's former lover)
Ayesha Singh as Ratti Sinha
Shashwita Sharma as Sandhiya Sinha
Rajesh Balwani as Alok Sinha
Mehul Kajaria as Sundar Sinha – Ishaan's cousin
Keith Sequeira as James (blackmailer)
Neetha Shetty as Kiran, Samrat's love interest
Vikram Chatterjee as Yash Singhania
Nalini Negi as Ishaani Sinha – Urmi and Ishaan's daughter; Shaurya's half-sister (2015)
Kunal Jaisingh/Shashank Sethi as Chiku Gaurav Singh (Asha and Gaurav's son)
Kapil Arya as Karan Tripathi
Pankaj Dheer as Mr. Jaamdar
Gaurav Chopra as Akash Kumar
Pallavi Dutt as Sheeba Kumar; Mrs. Akash Kumar
Mohit Shrivastava as Prathanesh Sharma
Shahab Khan as Mr Tiwari (Diya's father)
Sunayana Fozdar as Simran (Mr Akash Kumar's fashion designer)
Krishnam Sharma as Rahul
Karan Mishra as Deepak

Series overview

Production

Initially Mohit Malik rejected the role then Rahil Azam was signed for the show but was eventually replaced by Mohit Malik.

Chhavi Pandey auditioned for Parvati Sehgal's role but was rejected by the makers.

Karan Tacker was approached for Ishaan's role before finalizing Vibhav Roy in it but Karan rejected the role because of some personal issues.

Nikita Sharma was offered a role in the show which was earlier played by Priya Shinde in the show.

Falaq Naaz was chosen for playing the elder Anushka in the show after the five-year leap replacing Mehendi Jain as the younger one which was a strong character of an IPS Officer in the show but the makers scrapped her role because of excess characters in the six-year leap.

Mohit Malik was to play the role of adult Shaurya after leap but he quit the show because of Jhalak Dikhla Jaa.

Saurabh Raaj Jain was offered Shaurya's role which was later played by Kunal Karan Kapoor in the show.

Kanchi Singh was offered Nalini Negi's role but declined it as she thought it was a negative character.

Rajat Tokas was approached for the show but declined the part Gaurav Chopra played the part later.

Awards and nominations

References

External links 
 

2013 Indian television series debuts
Zee TV original programming
Indian television soap operas
Indian drama television series
Hindi-language television shows